Dragu Bădin (born 7 August 1947) is a Romanian former footballer who played as a defender. He was part of "U" Craiova's team that won the 1973–74 Divizia A, which was the first trophy in the club's history.

Honours
Universitatea Craiova
Divizia A: 1973–74
Cupa României runner-up: 1974–75

References

External links
Dragu Bădin at Labtof.ro

1947 births
Living people
Romanian footballers
Association football defenders
Liga I players
Liga II players
FC Petrolul Ploiești players
CS Universitatea Craiova players
AFC Dacia Unirea Brăila players
FCM Bacău players
CSM Jiul Petroșani players
Sportspeople from Brăila